In mathematics, more specifically in harmonic analysis, Walsh functions form a complete orthogonal set of functions that can be used to represent any discrete function—just like trigonometric functions can be used to represent any continuous function in Fourier analysis.  They can thus be viewed as a discrete, digital counterpart of the continuous, analog system of trigonometric functions on the unit interval. But unlike the sine and cosine functions, which are continuous, Walsh functions are piecewise constant. They take the values −1 and +1 only, on sub-intervals defined by dyadic fractions.

The system of Walsh functions is known as the Walsh system. It is an extension of the Rademacher system of orthogonal functions.

Walsh functions, the Walsh system, the Walsh series, and the fast Walsh–Hadamard transform are all named after the American mathematician Joseph L. Walsh. They find various applications in physics and engineering when analyzing digital signals.

Historically, various numerations of Walsh functions have been used; none of them is particularly superior to another. This articles uses the Walsh–Paley numeration.

Definition

We define the sequence of Walsh functions ,  as follows.

For any natural number k, and real number , let

Then, by definition

In particular,  everywhere on the interval, since all bits of k are zero.

Notice that  is precisely the Rademacher function rm.
Thus, the Rademacher system is a subsystem of the Walsh system. Moreover, every Walsh function is a product of Rademacher functions:

Comparison between Walsh functions and trigonometric functions

Walsh functions and trigonometric functions are both systems that form a complete, orthonormal set of functions, an orthonormal basis in Hilbert space  of the square-integrable functions on the unit interval. Both are systems of bounded functions, unlike, say, the Haar system or the Franklin system.

Both trigonometric and Walsh systems admit natural extension by periodicity from the unit interval to the real line . Furthermore, both Fourier analysis on the unit interval (Fourier series) and on the real line  (Fourier transform) have their digital counterparts defined via Walsh system, the Walsh series analogous to the Fourier series, and the Hadamard transform analogous to the Fourier transform.

Properties

The Walsh system is an orthonormal basis of Hilbert space . Orthonormality means

,

and being a basis means that if, for every , we set  then

Generalizations

Walsh-Ferleger systems

Let  be the compact Cantor group endowed with Haar measure and let  be its discrete group of characters. Of course, the characters are defined on  while Walsh functions are defined on the unit interval, but since there exists a modulo zero isomorphism between these measure spaces, measurable functions on them are identified via isometry.

Then basic representation theory suggests the following broad generalization of the concept of Walsh system.

Then  X is the closed linear span of the eigenspaces: . Assume that every eigenspace is one-dimensional and pick an element  such that . Then the system , or the same system in the Walsh-Paley numeration of the characters  is called generalized Walsh system associated with action . Classical Walsh system becomes a special case, namely, for

where  is addition modulo 2.

In the early 1990s, Serge Ferleger and Fyodor Sukochev showed that in a broad class of Banach spaces (so called UMD spaces ) generalized Walsh systems have many properties similar to the classical one: they form a Schauder basis  and a uniform finite dimensional decomposition  in the space, have property of random unconditional convergence.
One important example of generalized Walsh system is Fermion Walsh system in non-commutative Lp spaces associated with hyperfinite type II factor.

Fermion Walsh system

The Fermion Walsh system is a non-commutative, or "quantum" analog of the classical Walsh system. Unlike the latter, it consists of operators, not functions. Nevertheless, both systems share many important properties, e.g., both form an orthonormal basis in corresponding Hilbert space, or Schauder basis in corresponding symmetric spaces. Elements of the Fermion Walsh system are called Walsh operators.

The term Fermion in the name of the system is explained by the fact that the enveloping operator space, the so-called hyperfinite type II factor , may be viewed as the space of observables of the system of countably infinite number of distinct spin  fermions. Each Rademacher operator acts on one particular fermion coordinate only, and there it is a Pauli matrix. It may be identified with the observable measuring spin component of that fermion along one of the axes  in spin space. Thus, a Walsh operator measures the spin of a subset of fermions, each along its own axis.

Vilenkin system

Each  can be associated with the real number

For , let  where

The set  is called generalized Rademacher system. For each non-negative integer  there is a unique sequence  such that  and

Then  where

Binary Surfaces

Romanuke showed that Walsh functions can be generalized to binary surfaces in a particular case of function of two variables. There also exist eight Walsh-like bases of orthonormal binary functions, whose structure is nonregular (unlike the structure of Walsh functions). These eight bases are generalized to surfaces (in the case of the function of two variables) also. It was proved that piecewise-constant functions can be represented within each of nine bases (including the Walsh functions basis) as finite sums of binary functions, when weighted with proper coefficients.

Nonlinear Phase Extensions
Nonlinear phase extensions of discrete Walsh-Hadamard transform were developed. It was shown that the nonlinear phase basis functions with improved cross-correlation properties significantly outperform the traditional Walsh codes in code division multiple access (CDMA) communications.

Applications

Applications of the Walsh functions can be found wherever digit representations are used, including speech recognition, medical and biological image processing, and digital holography.

For example, the fast Walsh–Hadamard transform (FWHT) may be used in the analysis of digital quasi-Monte Carlo methods. In radio astronomy, Walsh functions can help reduce the effects of electrical crosstalk between antenna signals. They are also used in passive LCD panels as X and Y binary driving waveforms where the autocorrelation between X and Y can be made minimal for pixels that are off.

See also

Discrete Fourier transform
Fast Fourier transform
Harmonic analysis
Orthogonal functions
Walsh matrix
Parity function

Notes

References

External links

Special functions